List of boxing organisations in chronological order by the year of their establishment. The four major sanctioning bodies are in bold.

See also 

List of judo organizations
List of kickboxing organizations

References

Organisations
boxing